The One That Got Away is a 1996 ITV television film directed by Paul Greengrass and starring Paul McGann. It is based on the 1995 book of the same name by Chris Ryan telling the true story of a Special Air Service patrol during the Gulf War in 1991.

Plot 
Special Air Service patrol Bravo Two Zero is inserted into Iraq by helicopter to locate and destroy Iraqi Scud missile launchers. En route they find an unexpected group of Bedouin tribesmen and hide until they are noticed by a shepherd and exchange fire with armed fighters. They escape and return to the initial landing point but there is no helicopter waiting for them. While attempting to make contact, the patrol accidentally splits into a group of five soldiers heading to the road to hijack a vehicle and a group of three soldiers heading through the desert. Several days of travel later, seven of the soldiers have either died of hypothermia, been killed or been captured. Corporal Ryan journeys 180 miles to the Syrian border to escape.

See also 
 Bravo Two Zero (actual events)
 Bravo Two Zero (1993 novel)
 The One That Got Away (1995 novel)
 Bravo Two Zero (1999 film)
 Soldier Five (2004 novel)

External links 
 

1996 television films
1996 films
British television films
Films directed by Paul Greengrass
Films set in Iraq
Gulf War films
ITV television dramas
Television series by ITV Studios
War films based on actual events
Films about the Special Air Service
Films based on British novels
London Weekend Television shows
Films set in 1991
1990s English-language films